Gozo Poderoso is a 2000 album by Aterciopelados. It received Latin Grammy Nominations for Best Rock Vocal Album by a Duo or Group With Vocal and Record of the Year for the song "El Álbum", winning the former.

Track listing

Charts

References

External links

Aterciopelados albums
2000 albums